Geoffrey Jacob Deuel (born January 17, 1943) is an American actor. Best known as Dave Campbell in ‘’The Young & the Restless’’ (1973-1977).

Biography
Deuel is best known for playing Billy the Kid in the movie Chisum (1970). He has been in several movie and television productions through the years, including Barnaby Jones in the episode titled “The Last Contract” (12/31/1974); The Mod Squad, Ironside, and The Name of the Game, in which he acted opposite his older brother, the late Pete Duel, who starred in Love on a Rooftop and Alias Smith and Jones.

Filmography

Film

Television

References

Demetria Fulton; preview of Deuel’s role on Barnaby Jones in the episode titled “The Last Contract” (12/31/1974).

External links
 

1943 births
Living people
American male television actors
Male actors from Rochester, New York
American male film actors
20th-century American male actors